Mr. Fish is the name of two fictional supervillains appearing in American comic books published by Marvel Comics.

Publication history
The Mortimer Norris version of Mr. Fish first appeared in Luke Cage, Power Man #29 and was created by Bill Mantlo and George Tuska. Initially, Luke Cage, Power Man #29 was intended to continue a storyline from the 28th issue. The continuation of that story was running late. Because of these deadline considerations, the splash page admits, this fill-in story, "No One Laughs at Mr. Fish", was created to ensure #29 hit the stands on schedule.

The Bill Morris version of Mr. Fish first appeared in Daughters of the Dragon #4 and was created by Justin Gray, Jimmy Palmiotti, and Khari Evans.

Fictional character biography

Mortimer Norris
Mr. Fish was once an ordinary human being, a petty crook named Mortimer George Norris who stumbled upon some stolen radioactive material while on a job. The exposure made him dizzy and caused him to fall into the East River. When he emerged, he had been mutated into an amphibious fish-man with enhanced strength. He used these powers to establish a Maggia branch in his area, aided by a group of thugs and his second-in-command, a dwarf named "Shrike". This attempt was cut short by a battle with Luke Cage. Mr. Fish initially seemed to have the upper hand: his men overpowered Cage and Fish himself used a mysterious concussive ray gun to knock Cage out, taking him to a deserted construction site. However, and despite Shrike's advice to finish Cage off before he awoke, Mr. Fish waited until Cage awoke so that he could recount his origin and master plan. Cage got his second wind and made short work of Fish's men. In a desperate move, Fish rushed towards Cage with a steel girder, but Cage dodged and Fish fell off the building, seemingly dying on impact.

Mr. Fish turns up alive during the All-New, All-Different Marvel relaunch to warn Tombstone that the Black Cat will be targeting him and his criminal empire during an upcoming gang war for control of Harlem. Burgeoning crime lord Alex Wilder later crashes one of Tombstone and Mr. Fish's meetings, beating the former and magically banishing the latter to Hell. After recovering from the attack, Tombstone rescues Mr. Fish from Hell with the help of Black Talon.

During the Devil's Reign storyline, Mr. Fish was seen as an inmate of the Myrmidon. Moon Knight fought him in one of the prison matches and defeated him.

Bill Norris
Bill Norris, the first Mr. Fish's similarly-mutated brother, was introduced visiting an exotic nightclub with the Walrus.

He subsequently joined the Flashmob, a group of former opponents of Luke Cage, during Shadowland. The assemblage of villains confront the new Power Man, and are remanded to Ryker's Island after being defeated by him and Iron Fist. A few members of the Flashmob, including Mr. Fish, are eventually bailed out by Big Ben Donovan.

When a virus begins giving people spider-powers similar to Spider-Man's during the Spider-Island storyline, Mr. Fish and the rest of the Flashmob are among those infected, prompting them to try and escape from the quarantined Manhattan. They are prevented from doing so by the Heroes for Hire.

Powers and abilities
Mr. Fish has enhanced strength, a fish-like appearance.

Equipment
Mr. Fish wielded a gun.

Other versions

Marvel Adventures
This version of Mr. Fish was about to enact his master plan only for him and his henchmen to encounter the Fantastic Four. Human Torch used his flames to dehydrate Mr. Fish, enough for a police officer to knock him out and arrest him.

In other media
The Mortimer Norris incarnation of Mr. Fish appears in the Luke Cage episode "Wig Out", portrayed by Hakim Callender. This version is a human crime lord with no superhuman abilities.

References

External links
 
 

Characters created by Bill Mantlo
Characters created by George Tuska
Comics characters introduced in 1975
Fictional fish
Marvel Comics characters with superhuman strength
Marvel Comics supervillains
Luke Cage